Possum pie is a pie in American cuisine that is an iconic pie rarely seen outside Arkansas. The pie is made with several layers, usually a vanilla pudding or cream cheese layer, then another layer like chocolate custard. There are many different combinations making use of alternating layers of cream cheese and puddings topped with whipped cream. The pecan shortbread crust is different from other icebox pies.

The first mention of Possum Pie in the Arkansas Gazette dates to a 1983 restaurant review. The recipe itself doesn't begin to appear in food sections until the late 2000s. An earlier recipe for a layered nut-crumb crust pudding and cream cheese pie with whipped topping was submitted to the Arkansas Dairy Recipe Contest, a student content open to fourth-12th graders. Similar recipes for a pie called "The Next Best Thing to Robert Redford" were being published  by the Indianapolis Star and Los Angeles Times by 1982. Historically the term was mostly used in minstrel songs.

References

Sweet pies
Arkansas culture
American pies
No bake cakes
Custard desserts